The Government of Telangana  also known as Telangana Government, is the  governing authority of the state of Telangana in India. It consists of an executive, a judiciary and a legislative.

The state government is headed by the Governor of Telangana as the nominal head of state, with a democratically elected Chief Minister as the real head of the executive. The governor who is appointed for five years appoints the chief minister and his council of ministers. Even though the governor remains the ceremonial head of the state, the day-to-day running of the government is taken care of by the chief minister and his council of ministers in whom a great deal of legislative powers is vested. The state government maintains its capital at Hyderabad and is seated at the Government Secretariat or the Sachivalayam.

The Government of Telangana was formed on 2 June 2014 after bifurcation of Andhra Pradesh as part of Andhra Pradesh Reorganisation Act, 2014.

Government and administration

Structure
The Governor is the constitutional head and the Chief Minister is head of the government who also heads the council of ministers. The Chief Justice of the high court is the head of the judiciary.

Governor 

The Governor is appointed by the President for a term of five years. The executive and legislative powers lie with the Chief Minister and his council of ministers, who are appointed by the Governor. The Governors of the states and territories of India have similar powers and functions at the state level as that of the President of India at Union level. Only Indian citizens above 36 years of age are eligible for appointment. Governors discharge all constitutional functions such as the appointment of the Chief Minister, sending reports to the President about failure of constitutional machinery in a state, or with respect to issues relating to the assent to a bill passed by legislature, exercise or their own opinion.

Ekkadu Srinivasan Lakshmi Narasimhan was the governor from 2 June 2014 to 1 September 2019.

Tamilisai Soundararajan has been appointed as the governor on September 1, 2019.

The Governor enjoys many different types of powers:
Executive powers related to administration, appointments, and removals.
Legislative powers related to lawmaking and the state legislature.
Discretionary powers to be carried out according to the discretion of the Governor.

Legislature 

The legislature comprises the governor and the legislative assembly, which is the highest political organ in the state.  All members of the legislative assembly are directly elected

The current assembly consists of 119 elected members and one member nominated by the governor.The normal term of the legislative assembly is five years from the date appointed for its first meeting

Judiciary 

The Telangana High Court is the apex court for the state. It is a court of record and has all the powers of such a court including the authority to punish an individual for contempt of court.

Executive
Like in other Indian states, the Executive arm of the state is responsible for the day-to-day management of the state. It consists of the Governor, the Chief Minister and the Council of Ministers.
 
The secretariat headed by the secretary to the governor assists the council of ministers.  The chief minister is assisted by the chief secretary, who is the head of the administrative services.

Chief Minister 

The executive authority is headed by the Chief Minister of  Telangana, who is the de facto head of state and is vested with most of the executive powers; the Legislative Assembly's majority party leader is appointed to this position by the Governor. The present Chief Minister is Kalvakuntla Chandrashekar Rao, who took office on 2 June 2014. Generally, the party which reaches more than half mark i.e. 60 seats out of 119 decides the Chief Minister.

Council of Ministers 

The Council of Ministers, which answers to the Legislative Assembly, has its members appointed by the Governor; the appointments receive input from the Chief Minister. They are collectively responsible to the legislative assembly of the State. Generally, the winning party and its chief minister chooses the ministers list and submit the list for the governor's approval.

Administrative divisions
Telangana State has been divided into 33 districts.  The business of the state government is transacted through the various secretariat departments based on the rules of business. Each department consists of secretary to government, who is the official head of the department and such other undersecretaries, junior secretaries, officers, and staffs subordinate to him/her. The Chief secretary superintending control over the whole secretariat and staff attached to the ministers.

Council of Ministers

Elections 

Elections to the state assembly are held every five years. Elections are generally held for Parliament, State assembly and regional panchayats. Like all other Indian states, the minimum age of registration of a voter is 18 years.

Election Commission announced dates for elections in five states including Madhya Pradesh, Rajasthan, Telangana, Chhattisgarh and Mizoram. Polls in Telangana, Rajasthan on Dec 7, results on Dec 11: EC

See also 
 T App Folio

References

External links 
 
 Telangana Gov. Gifted 1000sq.metre Yard Land To P.V Sindhu
 Telangana gov. gave 5 crore(US$740,000) to P.V Sindhu after achieving Silver Medal in RIO Olympics.